Muriel Nissel (née Griffiths; 30 January 1921 – 2010) was a British statistician and civil servant. Together with Claus Moser, she created "a national survey analysing trends in social welfare", that was to become Social Trends, first published in 1970, and considered to be the "statistician's bible", before working on the "distribution and redistribution of wealth". Nissel also wrote well-regarded books, including People Count – a history of the General Register Office, and Married to the Amadeus: Life with a String Quartet.

Early life
She was born Muriel Griffiths on 30 January 1921 at 38 Perham Road, Fulham, London, the only child of Evan Griffiths, a civil servant who worked for the General Post Office, and his wife, Bessie May Griffiths, née Phillips, a governess.

She grew up in Potters Bar, Middlesex. She was educated at Queenswood School, in Hatfield, having won a boarding scholarship, followed by St Hugh's College, Oxford, where she earned a first-class degree in philosophy, politics, and economics in 1942.

Career
After Oxford, she joined the Ministry of Fuel and Power in 1942, working as an economic statistician for Harold Wilson the future Prime Minister.

In 1964 Nissel joined the London School of Economics as a research assistant, working there with Professor Claus Moser, who became her mentor. Later in 1964, Nissel also joined the government's Central Statistical Office (CSO) as a financial statistician.

In 1967 she and Moser started work on "a national survey analysing trends in social welfare", that was to become Social Trends, first published in 1970, and considered to be the "statistician's bible". She edited Social Trends until 1975, when she began work on the "distribution and redistribution of wealth".

Nissel also wrote well-regarded books, including People Count – a history of the General Register Office, and Married to the Amadeus: Life with a String Quartet.

Publications
 People Count – a history of the General Register Office, HMSO, 1987. 
 Married to the Amadeus: Life with a String Quartet, Giles de la Mare Publishers Limited

Personal life
On 26 January 1946, she married William Hans Barbour (1913–2000), and they later divorced. On 5 April 1957, having changed her name to Muriel Morley, she married Siegmund Walter "Sigi" Nissel (1922–2008), the violinist and member of the Amadeus Quartet. They had two children, Claire (born 1958) and Daniel (born 1962).

Later life

References

1921 births
2010 deaths
British statisticians
People educated at Queenswood School
Alumni of St Hugh's College, Oxford
People from Fulham
People from Potters Bar
British civil servants